Arneae or Arneai was a small city of ancient Lycia mentioned by Capito in his Isaurica. It is located near Ernes, in the interior of Lycia where archaeological remains have been found.

Bishopric 
Since it was in the Roman province of Lycia, the bishopric of Arneae was a suffragan of the metropolitan see of Myra, the province's capital. No name of any of its bishops is identified in Le Quien's Oriens christianus in quatuor Patriarchatus digestus. However, the see appears in ninth place among the suffragans of Arneae in the Notitiae Episcopatuum of Pseudo-Epiphanius, composed under Byzantine Emperor Heraclius in about 640.

No longer a residential bishopric, Arneae is today listed by the Catholic Church as a titular see.

Notable residents
Lalla of Arneae, first century

References

Populated places in ancient Lycia
Ancient Greek archaeological sites in Turkey
Former populated places in Turkey
Catholic titular sees in Asia
Populated places of the Byzantine Empire
Defunct dioceses of the Ecumenical Patriarchate of Constantinople
Finike District